Paul Wild (5 October 1925 – 2 July 2014) was a Swiss astronomer and director of the Astronomical Institute of the University of Bern, who discovered numerous comets, asteroids and supernovae.

Biography 

Wild was born on 5 October 1925 in the village of Wädenswil near Zürich, Switzerland. From 1944 through 1950, he studied mathematics and physics at the ETH Zurich. Thereafter, he worked at the California Institute of Technology where he researched galaxies and supernovas under the leadership of countryman Fritz Zwicky from 1951 through 1955.

At the Zimmerwald Observatory, near Bern, Wild made his first cometary discovery C/1957 U1 (1957 IX) on 2 October 1957. The parabolic comet was later named "Latyshev-Wild–Burnham".

Professor Wild became director of the Astronomical Institute of the University of Bern in 1980, and remained in this position until 1991. He died on 2 July 2014 at the age of 88 in Bern.

Discoveries 

During countless nights Wild observed the skies at the Zimmerwald Observatory near Bern and discovered numerous asteroids, comets and supernovae including:
 4 periodic comets: 63P/Wild, 81P/Wild, 86P/Wild and 116P/Wild
 3 parabolic comets: C/1957 U1, C/1967 C2 and C/1968 U1
 The Apollo asteroid 1866 Sisyphus and the two Amor asteroids 2368 Beltrovata and 3552 Don Quixote
 41 supernovae, as well as 8 co-discoveries. His first discovered supernova was SN 1954A, while his most recent is SN 1994M.

The best known discovery of a comet occurred on 6 January 1978. This Jupiter-family comet was designated 1978 XI, P/Wild 2 or 81P/Wild. Wild 2 was chosen by NASA for its Stardust mission launched in 1999. The stardust spacecraft flew through the comet's trail and collected samples of the tail's dust. After the return of the spacecraft to earth, analysis of the dust particles by different researcher provided new insights about the evolution of the solar system. Organic compounds such as glycine, a fundamental chemical building block of life, were found on a comet for the first time. In addition, evidence of the presence of liquid water was detected.

List of discovered asteroids 

He is credited by the Minor Planet Center with the discovery of 94 numbered minor planets during 1961–1994, one of which was a co-discovery with Czech-born Swiss astronomer Ivo Baueršíma.

See also 
 List of minor planet discoverers

External links 
 
 Astronomical Institute of the University of Berne

References 
 

1925 births
2014 deaths
Discoverers of asteroids
Discoverers of comets
Discoverers of supernovae

ETH Zurich alumni
People from Wädenswil
20th-century Swiss astronomers